Xiphisterinae is a subfamily of marine ray-finned fishes, classified within the family Stichaeidae, the pricklebacks or shannies.  These fishes are found in the North Pacific Ocean.

Genera
The subfamily contains the following genera († means extinct):

References

Stichaeidae
 
Taxa described in 1898
Fish subfamilies